Dmitri Ivanovich Stratan (born 24 January 1975) is a Soviet and Russian water polo forward. He competed in the 1996 Summer Olympics for the Ukrainian team that finished in 12th place. At the next two Olympics he played for Russia and won a silver and bronze medal, respectively. He was also part of the Russian teams that won bronze medals at the 1997 European and 2001 world championships.

Stratan is Moldavian by birth, but in 1997 received Russian citizenship. He was born in Lviv, Ukraine, and graduated from the Institute of Physical Education there. He played for two years in Slovenia, and one year in France, and lived for some time in Lyubertsy, Moscow Oblast, where he played for Shturm 2002. He finally settled in Volgograd, Russia. Stratan is married and has a son Dan and a daughter Dasha.

See also
 List of Olympic medalists in water polo (men)

References

External links

 

1975 births
Living people
Russian male water polo players
Ukrainian male water polo players
Water polo players at the 1996 Summer Olympics
Water polo players at the 2000 Summer Olympics
Water polo players at the 2004 Summer Olympics
Olympic water polo players of Russia
Olympic water polo players of Ukraine
Olympic silver medalists for Russia
Olympic bronze medalists for Russia
Sportspeople from Lviv
Olympic medalists in water polo
Medalists at the 2004 Summer Olympics
Medalists at the 2000 Summer Olympics
World Aquatics Championships medalists in water polo